The Honeymoon's Over is a 1939 American comedy film directed by Eugene Forde and written by Leonard Hoffman, Hamilton MacFadden and Clay Williams. It is based on the 1921 play Six-Cylinder Love by William Anthony McGuire. The film stars Stuart Erwin, Marjorie Weaver, Patric Knowles, Russell Hicks, Jack Carson and Hobart Cavanaugh. The film was released on December 14, 1939, by 20th Century Fox.

Plot

Cast       
Stuart Erwin as Donald Todd
Marjorie Weaver as Betty Stewart Todd
Patric Knowles as Pat Shields 
Russell Hicks as J.P. Walker
Jack Carson as Tom Donroy
Hobart Cavanaugh as Avery Butterfield
June Gale as Peggy Ryder
E. E. Clive as Col. Shelby
Renie Riano as Annie
Harrison Greene as Charlie Winslow
Lelah Tyler as Mrs. Geraldine Winslow
Harry Hayden as Roger Burton
Nedda Harrigan as Mrs. Molly Burton
Frank McGlynn Sr. as Thin Man
Robert Greig as Horace Kellogg

References

External links
 

1939 films
1930s English-language films
20th Century Fox films
American comedy films
1939 comedy films
Films directed by Eugene Forde
American black-and-white films
Films scored by Samuel Kaylin
1930s American films